The 2015 European Karate Championships, the 50th edition, was held at Istanbul in Turkey from 19 to 22 March, 2015. A total of 482 competitors from 47 countries participated at the event.

Medalists

Men's competition

Individual

Team

Women's competition

Individual

Team

Medal table

Participating countries

References

External links
 Results

European Karate Championships
International karate competitions hosted by Turkey
European Karate Championships
European championships in 2015
Sport in Istanbul
2015 in Istanbul
Karate competitions in Turkey
European Karate Championships